Ephesus (may ultimately derive from ) was a city in  ancient Greece on the coast of Ionia,  southwest of present-day Selçuk in İzmir Province, Turkey. It was built in the 10th century BC on the site of Apasa, the former Arzawan capital,  by Attic and Ionian Greek colonists. During the Classical Greek era, it was one of twelve cities that were members of the Ionian League. The city came under the control of the Roman Republic in 129 BC.

The city was famous in its day for the nearby Temple of Artemis (completed around 550 BC), which has been designated one of the Seven Wonders of the Ancient World. Its many monumental buildings included the Library of Celsus and a theatre capable of holding 24,000 spectators.

Ephesus was recipient city of one of the Pauline epistles; one of the seven churches of Asia addressed in the Book of Revelation; the Gospel of John may have been written there; and it was the site of several 5th-century Christian Councils (see Council of Ephesus). The city was destroyed by the Goths in 263. Although it was afterwards rebuilt, its importance as a commercial centre declined as the harbour was slowly silted up by the Küçükmenderes River. In 614, it was partially destroyed by an earthquake.

Today, the ruins of Ephesus are a favourite international and local tourist attraction, being accessible from Adnan Menderes Airport and from the resort town Kuşadası. In 2015, the ruins were designated a UNESCO World Heritage Site.

History

Neolithic age 
Humans had begun inhabiting the area surrounding Ephesus by the Neolithic Age (about 6000 BC), as shown by evidence from excavations at the nearby höyük (artificial mounds known as tells) of Arvalya and Cukurici.

Bronze Age 

Excavations in recent years have unearthed settlements from the early Bronze Age at Ayasuluk Hill. According to Hittite sources, the capital of the kingdom of Arzawa (another independent state in Western and Southern Anatolia/Asia Minor) was Apasa (or Abasa), and some scholars suggest that this is the same place the Greeks later called Ephesus. In 1954, a burial ground from the Mycenaean era (1500–1400 BC), which contained ceramic pots, was discovered close to the ruins of the basilica of St. John. This was the period of the Mycenaean expansion, when the Ahhiyawa began settling in Asia Minor, a process that continued into the 13th century BC. The names Apasa and Ephesus appear to be cognate, and recently found inscriptions seem to pinpoint the places in the Hittite record.

Period of Greek migrations

Ephesus was founded as an Attic-Ionian colony in the 10th century BC on a hill (now known as the Ayasuluk Hill), three kilometers from the centre of ancient Ephesus (as attested by excavations at the Seljuk castle during the 1990s). The mythical founder of the city was a prince of Athens named Androklos, who had to leave his country after the death of his father, King Kodros. According to the legend, he founded Ephesus on the place where the oracle of Delphi became reality ("A fish and a boar will show you the way"). Androklos drove away most of the native Carian and Lelegian inhabitants of the city and united his people with the remainder. He was a successful warrior, and as a king he was able to join the twelve cities of Ionia together into the Ionian League. During his reign the city began to prosper. He died in a battle against the Carians when he came to the aid of Priene, another city of the Ionian League. Androklos and his dog are depicted on the Hadrian temple frieze, dating from the 2nd century. Later, Greek historians such as Pausanias, Strabo and Herodotos and the poet Kallinos reassigned the city's mythological foundation to Ephos, queen of the Amazons.

The Greek goddess Artemis and the great Anatolian goddess Kybele were identified together as Artemis of Ephesus. The many-breasted "Lady of Ephesus", identified with Artemis, was venerated in the Temple of Artemis, one of the Seven Wonders of the World and the largest building of the ancient world according to Pausanias (4.31.8). Pausanias mentions that the temple was built by Ephesus, son of the river god Caystrus, before the arrival of the Ionians. Of this structure, scarcely a trace remains.

Ancient sources seem to indicate that an older name of the place was Alope.

Archaic period 

About 650 BC, Ephesus was attacked by the Cimmerians who razed the city, including the temple of Artemis. After the Cimmerians had been driven away, the city was ruled by a series of tyrants. Following a revolt by the people, Ephesus was ruled by a council. The city prospered again under a new rule, producing a number of important historical figures such as the elegiac poet Callinus and the iambic poet Hipponax, the philosopher Heraclitus, the great painter Parrhasius and later the grammarian Zenodotos and physicians Soranus and Rufus.

About 560 BC, Ephesus was conquered by the Lydians under king Croesus, who, though a harsh ruler, treated the inhabitants with respect and even became the main contributor to the reconstruction of the temple of Artemis. His signature has been found on the base of one of the columns of the temple (now on display in the British Museum). Croesus made the populations of the different settlements around Ephesus regroup (synoikismos) in the vicinity of the Temple of Artemis, enlarging the city.

Later in the same century, the Lydians under Croesus invaded Persia. The Ionians refused a peace offer from Cyrus the Great, siding with the Lydians instead. After the Persians defeated Croesus, the Ionians offered to make peace, but Cyrus insisted that they surrender and become part of the empire. They were defeated by the Persian army commander Harpagos in 547 BC. The Persians then incorporated the Greek cities of Asia Minor into the Achaemenid Empire. Those cities were then ruled by satraps.

Ephesus has intrigued archaeologists because for the Archaic Period there is no definite location for the settlement. There are numerous sites to suggest the movement of a settlement between the Bronze Age and the Roman period, but the silting up of the natural harbours as well as the movement of the Kayster River meant that the location never remained the same.

Classical period 

Ephesus continued to prosper, but when taxes were raised under Cambyses II and Darius, the Ephesians participated in the Ionian Revolt against Persian rule in the Battle of Ephesus (498 BC), an event which instigated the Greco-Persian wars. In 479 BC, the Ionians, together with Athens, were able to oust the Persians from the shores of Asia Minor. In 478 BC, the Ionian cities with Athens entered into the Delian League against the Persians. Ephesus did not contribute ships but gave financial support.

During the Peloponnesian War, Ephesus was first allied to Athens but in a later phase, called the Decelean War, or the Ionian War, sided with Sparta, which also had received the support of the Persians. As a result, rule over the cities of Ionia was ceded again to Persia.

These wars did not greatly affect daily life in Ephesus. The Ephesians were surprisingly modern in their social relations: they allowed strangers to integrate and education was valued. In later times, Pliny the Elder mentioned having seen at Ephesus a representation of the goddess Diana by Timarete, the daughter of a painter.

In 356 BC the temple of Artemis was burnt down, according to legend, by a lunatic called Herostratus. The inhabitants of Ephesus at once set about restoring the temple and even planned a larger and grander one than the original.

Hellenistic period 

When Alexander the Great defeated the Persian forces at the Battle of Granicus in 334 BC, the Greek cities of Asia Minor were liberated. The pro-Persian tyrant Syrpax and his family were stoned to death, and Alexander was greeted warmly when he entered Ephesus in triumph. When Alexander saw that the temple of Artemis was not yet finished, he proposed to finance it and have his name inscribed on the front. But the inhabitants of Ephesus demurred, claiming that it was not fitting for one god to build a temple to another. After Alexander's death in 323 BC, Ephesus in 290 BC came under the rule of one of Alexander's generals, Lysimachus.

As the river Cayster (Grk. name Κάϋστρος) silted up the old harbour, the resulting marshes caused malaria and many deaths among the inhabitants. Lysimachus forced the people to move from the ancient settlement around the temple of Artemis to the present site two kilometres away, when as a last resort the king flooded the old city by blocking the sewers. The new settlement was officially called Arsinoea ( or Ἀρσινοΐα) or Arsinoe (Ἀρσινόη), after the king's second wife, Arsinoe II of Egypt. After Lysimachus had destroyed the nearby cities of Lebedos and Colophon in 292 BC, he relocated their inhabitants to the new city.

Ephesus revolted after the treacherous death of Agathocles, giving the Hellenistic king of Syria and Mesopotamia Seleucus I Nicator an opportunity for removing and killing Lysimachus, his last rival, at the Battle of Corupedium in 281 BC. After the death of Lysimachus the town again was named Ephesus.

Thus Ephesus became part of the Seleucid Empire. After the murder of king Antiochus II Theos and his Egyptian wife, pharaoh Ptolemy III invaded the Seleucid Empire and the Egyptian fleet swept the coast of Asia Minor. Ephesus came under Egyptian rule between 263 and 197 BC.

The Seleucid king Antiochus III the Great tried to regain the Greek cities of Asia Minor and recaptured Ephesus in 196 BC but he then came into conflict with Rome. After a series of battles, he was defeated by Scipio Asiaticus at the Battle of Magnesia in 190 BC. As a result of the subsequent Treaty of Apamea, Ephesus came under the rule of Eumenes II, the Attalid king of Pergamon, (ruled 197–159 BC). When his grandson Attalus III died in 133 BC without male children of his own, he left his kingdom to the Roman Republic, on condition that the city of Pergamon be kept free and autonomous.

Classical Roman period (129 BC–395 AD) 

Ephesus, as part of the kingdom of Pergamon, became a subject of the Roman Republic in 129 BC after the revolt of Eumenes III was suppressed.

The city felt Roman influence at once; taxes rose considerably, and the treasures of the city were systematically plundered. Hence in 88 BC Ephesus welcomed Archelaus, a general of Mithridates, king of Pontus, when he conquered Asia (the Roman name for western Asia Minor). From Ephesus, Mithridates ordered every Roman citizen in the province to be killed which led to the Asiatic Vespers, the slaughter of 80,000 Roman citizens in Asia, or any person who spoke with a Latin accent. Many had lived in Ephesus, and statues and monument of Roman citizens in Ephesus were also destroyed. But when they saw how badly the people of Chios had been treated by Zenobius, a general of Mithridates, they refused entry to his army. Zenobius was invited into the city to visit Philopoemen, the father of Monime, the favourite wife of Mithridates, and the overseer of Ephesus. As the people expected nothing good of him, they threw him into prison and murdered him. Mithridates took revenge and inflicted terrible punishments. However, the Greek cities were given freedom and several substantial rights. Ephesus became, for a short time, self-governing. When Mithridates was defeated in the First Mithridatic War by the Roman consul Lucius Cornelius Sulla, Ephesus came back under Roman rule in 86 BC. Sulla imposed a huge indemnity, along with five years of back taxes, which left Asian cities heavily in debt for a long time to come.

King Ptolemy XII Auletes of Egypt retired to Ephesus in 57 BC, passing his time in the sanctuary of the temple of Artemis when the Roman Senate failed to restore him to his throne.

Mark Antony was welcomed by Ephesus for periods when he was proconsul and in 33 BC with Cleopatra when he gathered his fleet of 800 ships before the battle of Actium with Octavius.

When Augustus became emperor in 27 BC, the most important change was when he made Ephesus the capital of proconsular Asia (which covered western Asia Minor) instead of Pergamum. Ephesus then entered an era of prosperity, becoming both the seat of the governor and a major centre of commerce. According to Strabo, it was second in importance and size only to Rome.

The city and temple were destroyed by the Goths in 263. This marked the decline of the city's splendour. However emperor Constantine the Great rebuilt much of the city and erected new public baths.

The Roman population

Until recently, the population of Ephesus in Roman times was estimated to number up to 225,000 people by Broughton. More recent scholarship regards these estimates as unrealistic. Such a large estimate would require population densities seen in only a few ancient cities, or extensive settlement outside the city walls. This would have been impossible at Ephesus because of the mountain ranges, coastline and quarries which surrounded the city.

Not all of this area was inhabited due to public buildings and spaces in the city center and the steep slope of the Bülbül Dağı mountain, which was enclosed by the wall. Ludwig Burchner estimated this area with the walls at 1000.5 acres. Jerome Murphy-O'Connor uses an estimate of 345 hectares for the inhabited land or 835 acres (Murphey cites Ludwig Burchner). He cites Josiah Russell using 832 acres and Old Jerusalem in 1918 as the yardstick estimated the population at 51,068 at 148.5 persons per hectare. Using 510 persons per hectare, he arrives at a population between 138,000 and 172,500. He argues that population densities of 150 or 250 people per hectare are more realistic, which gives a range of 33,600 to 56,000 inhabitants. Even with these much lower population estimates, Ephesus was one of the largest cities of Roman Asia Minor, ranking it as the largest city after Sardis and Alexandria Troas. Hanson and Ortman (2017)  estimate an inhabited area to be 263 hectares and their demographic model yields an estimate of 71,587 inhabitants, with a population density of 276 inhabitants per hectare. By contrast, Rome within the walls encompassed 1,500 hectares and as over 400 built-up hectares were left outside the Aurelian Wall, whose construction was begun in 274 CE and finished in 279 CE, the total inhabited area plus public spaces inside the walls consisted of ca. 1,900 hectares. Imperial Rome had a population estimated to be between 750,000 and one million (Hanson and Ortman's (2017) model yields an estimate of 923,406 inhabitants), which imply in a population density of 395 to 526 inhabitants per hectare, including public spaces.

Byzantine Roman period (395–1308) 

Ephesus remained the most important city of the Byzantine Empire in Asia after Constantinople in the 5th and 6th centuries.  Emperor Flavius Arcadius raised the level of the street between the theatre and the harbour. The basilica of St. John was built during the reign of emperor Justinian I in the 6th century.

Excavations in 2022 indicate that large parts of the city were destroyed in 614/615 by a military conflict, most likely during the Sasanian War, which initiated a drastic decline in the city's population and standard of living.

The importance of the city as a commercial centre further declined as the harbour, today 5 kilometres inland, was slowly silted up by the river (today, Küçük Menderes) despite repeated dredging during the city's history. The loss of its harbour caused Ephesus to lose its access to the Aegean Sea, which was important for trade. People started leaving the lowland of the city for the surrounding hills. The ruins of the temples were used as building blocks for new homes. Marble sculptures were ground to powder to make lime for plaster.

Sackings by the Arabs first in the year 654–655 by caliph Muawiyah I, and later in 700 and 716 hastened the decline further.

When the Seljuk Turks conquered Ephesus in 1090, it was a small village. The Byzantines resumed control in 1097 and changed the name of the town to Hagios Theologos. They kept control of the region until 1308. Crusaders passing through were surprised that there was only a small village, called Ayasalouk, where they had expected a bustling city with a large seaport. Even the temple of Artemis was completely forgotten by the local population. The Crusaders of the Second Crusade fought the Seljuks just outside the town in December 1147.

Pre-Ottoman period (1304–1390) 

The town surrendered, on 24 October 1304, to Sasa Bey, a Turkish warlord of the Menteşoğulları principality. Nevertheless, contrary to the terms of the surrender the Turks pillaged the church of Saint John and deported most of the local population to Thyrea, Greece when a revolt seemed probable. During these events many of the remaining inhabitants were massacred.

Shortly afterwards, Ephesus was ceded to the Aydinid principality that stationed a powerful navy in the harbour of Ayasuluğ (the present-day Selçuk, next to Ephesus). Ayasoluk became an important harbour, from which piratical raids to the surrounding Christian regions were organised, both official by the state and private.

The town knew again a short period of prosperity during the 14th century under these new Seljuk rulers. They added important architectural works such as the İsa Bey Mosque, caravansaries and Turkish bathhouses (hamam).

Ottoman period 

Ephesians were incorporated as vassals into the Ottoman Empire for the first time in 1390. The Central Asian warlord Tamerlane defeated the Ottomans in Anatolia in 1402, and the Ottoman sultan Bayezid I died in captivity. The region was restored to the Anatolian beyliks. After a period of unrest, the region was again incorporated into the Ottoman Empire in 1425.

Ephesus was completely abandoned by the 15th century. Nearby Ayasuluğ (Ayasoluk being a corrupted form of the original Greek name) was turkified to Selçuk in 1914.

Ephesus and Christianity

Ephesus was an important centre for Early Christianity from the AD 50s. From AD 52–54, the apostle Paul lived in Ephesus, working with the congregation and apparently organizing missionary activity into the hinterlands. Initially, according to the Acts of the Apostles, Paul attended the Jewish synagogue in Ephesus, but after three months he became frustrated with the stubbornness of some of the Jews, and moved his base to the school of Tyrannus. The Jamieson-Fausset-Brown Bible Commentary reminds readers that the unbelief of "some" implies that "others, probably a large number, believed" and therefore there must have been a community of Jewish Christians in Ephesus. Paul introduced about twelve men to the 'baptism with the Holy Spirit' who had previously only experienced the baptism of John the Baptist. Later a silversmith named Demetrios stirred up a mob against Paul, saying that he was endangering the livelihood of those making silver Artemis shrines. Demetrios in connection with the temple of Artemis mentions some object (perhaps an image or a stone) "fallen from Zeus". Between 53 and 57 AD Paul wrote the letter 1 Corinthians from Ephesus (possibly from the 'Paul tower' near the harbour, where he was imprisoned for a short time). Later, Paul wrote the Epistle to the Ephesians while he was in prison in Rome (around 62 AD).

Roman Asia was associated with John, one of the chief apostles, and the Gospel of John might have been written in Ephesus, c 90–100. Ephesus was one of the seven cities addressed in the Book of Revelation, indicating that the church at Ephesus was strong.

According to Eusebius of Caesarea, Saint Timothy was the first bishop of Ephesus.

Polycrates of Ephesus was a bishop at the Church of Ephesus in the 2nd century.  He is best known for his letter addressed to the  Pope Victor I, Bishop of Rome, defending the Quartodeciman position in the Easter controversy.

In the early 2nd century, the church at Ephesus was still important enough to be addressed by a letter written by Bishop Ignatius of Antioch to the Ephesians which begins with "Ignatius, who is also called Theophorus, to the Church which is at Ephesus, in Asia, deservedly most happy, being blessed in the greatness and fullness of God the Father, and predestinated before the beginning of time, that it should be always for an enduring and unchangeable glory" (Letter to the Ephesians). The church at Ephesus had given their support for Ignatius, who was taken to Rome for execution.

A legend, which was first mentioned by Epiphanius of Salamis in the 4th century, purported that Mary, the mother of Jesus, may have spent the last years of her life in Ephesus. The Ephesians derived the argument from John's presence in the city, and Jesus’ instructions to John to take care of his mother, Mary, after his death. Epiphanius, however, was keen to point out that, while the Bible says John was leaving for Asia, it does not say specifically that Mary went with him. He later stated that she was buried in Jerusalem. It is a popular place of Catholic pilgrimage which has been visited by three recent popes.

The Church of Mary near the harbour of Ephesus was the setting for the Third Ecumenical Council in 431, which resulted in the condemnation of Nestorius. A Second Council of Ephesus was held in 449, but its controversial acts were never approved by the Catholics. It came to be called the Robber Council of Ephesus or Robber Synod of Latrocinium by its opponents.

Seven Sleepers 

Ephesus is believed to be the city of the Seven Sleepers, who were persecuted by the Roman emperor Decius because of their Christianity, and they slept in a cave for three centuries, outlasting their persecution.

They are considered saints by Catholics and Orthodox Christians and whose story is also mentioned in the Qur'an,

Main sites 

Ephesus is one of the largest Roman archaeological sites in the eastern Mediterranean. The visible ruins still give some idea of the city's original splendour, and the names associated with the ruins are evocative of its former life. The theatre dominates the view down Harbour Street, which leads to the silted-up harbour.

The Temple of Artemis, one of the Seven Wonders of the Ancient World, once stood 418' by 239' with over 100 marble pillars each 56' high.  The temple earned the city the title "Servant of the Goddess".  Pliny tells us that the magnificent structure took 120 years to build but is now represented only by one inconspicuous column, revealed during an archaeological excavation by the British Museum in the 1870s. Some fragments of the frieze (which are insufficient to suggest the form of the original) and other small finds were removed – some to London and some to the İstanbul Archaeology Museums.

The Library of Celsus, the façade of which has been carefully reconstructed from original pieces, was originally built c. 125 in memory of Tiberius Julius Celsus Polemaeanus, an Ancient Greek who served as governor of Roman Asia (105–107) in the Roman Empire. Celsus paid for the construction of the library with his own personal wealth and is buried in a sarcophagus beneath it. The library was mostly built by his son Gaius Julius Aquila and once held nearly 12,000 scrolls. Designed with an exaggerated entrance — so as to enhance its perceived size, speculate many historians — the building faces east so that the reading rooms could make best use of the morning light.

The interior of the library measured roughly 180 square metres (2,000 square feet) and may have contained as many as 12,000 scrolls. By the year 400 C.E. the library was no longer in use after being damaged in 262 C.E. The facade was reconstructed during 1970 to 1978 using fragments found on site or copies of fragments that were previously removed to museums.

At an estimated 25,000 seating capacity, the theatre is believed to be the largest in the ancient world. This open-air theatre was used initially for drama, but during later Roman times gladiatorial combats were also held on its stage; the first archaeological evidence of a gladiator graveyard was found in May 2007.

There were two agoras, one for commercial and one for state business.

Ephesus also had several major bath complexes, built at various times while the city was under Roman rule.

The city had one of the most advanced aqueduct systems in the ancient world, with at least six aqueducts of various sizes supplying different areas of the city. They fed a number of water mills, one of which has been identified as a sawmill for marble.

The Odeon was a small roofed theatre constructed by Publius Vedius Antoninus and his wife around 150 AD. It was a small salon for plays and concerts, seating about 1,500 people. There were 22 stairs in the theatre. The upper part of the theatre was decorated with red granite pillars in the Corinthian style. The entrances were at both sides of the stage and reached by a few steps.

The Temple of Hadrian dates from the 2nd century but underwent repairs in the 4th century and has been reerected from the surviving architectural fragments. The reliefs in the upper sections are casts, the originals now being exhibited in the Ephesus Archaeological Museum. A number of figures are depicted in the reliefs, including the emperor Theodosius I with his wife and eldest son. The temple was depicted on the reverse of the Turkish 20 million lira banknote of 2001–2005 and of the 20 new lira banknote of 2005–2009.

The Temple of the Sebastoi (sometimes called the Temple of Domitian), dedicated to the Flavian dynasty, was one of the largest temples in the city. It was erected on a pseudodipteral plan with 8 × 13 columns. The temple and its statue are some of the few remains connected with Domitian.

The Tomb/Fountain of Pollio was erected in 97 AD in honour of C. Sextilius Pollio, who constructed the Marnas aqueduct, by Offilius Proculus. It has a concave façade.

A part of the site, Basilica of St. John, was built in the 6th century, under emperor Justinian I, over the supposed site of the apostle's tomb. It is now surrounded by Selçuk.

Archaeology 

The history of archaeological research in Ephesus stretches back to 1863, when British architect John Turtle Wood, sponsored by the British Museum, began to search for the Artemision. In 1869 he discovered the pavement of the temple, but since further expected discoveries were not made the excavations stopped in 1874. In 1895 German archaeologist Otto Benndorf, financed by a 10,000 guilder donation made by Austrian Karl Mautner Ritter von Markhof, resumed excavations. In 1898 Benndorf founded the Austrian Archaeological Institute, which plays a leading role in Ephesus today.

Finds from the site are exhibited notably in the Ephesos Museum in Vienna, the Ephesus Archaeological Museum in Selçuk and in the British Museum.

In October 2016, Turkey halted the works of the archeologists, which had been ongoing for more than 100 years, due to tensions between Austria and Turkey. In May 2018, Turkey allowed Austrian archeologists to resume their excavations.

Notable people 
Heraclitus (c. 535 – c. 475 BC), Presocratic philosopher 
Hipponax (6th Century BC), poet
Zeuxis (5th century BC), painter
Parrhasius (5th century BC), painter
Herostratus (d 356 BC), criminal
Zenodotus (fl. 280 BC), grammarian and literary critic, first librarian of the Library of Alexandria
Agasias (2nd century BC), Greek sculptors
Menander (early 2nd century BC), historian
Artemidorus Ephesius (c. 100 BC), geographer
Tiberius Julius Celsus Polemaeanus (ca. 45 – before ca. 120), founder of the Celsus library
Publius Hordeonius Lollianus (1st century), sophist
Rufus (1st century), physician
Polycrates of Ephesus (130 – 196), bishop
Soranus of Ephesus (1st–2nd century), physician
Artemidorus (2nd century AD), diviner and author
Xenophon (2nd–3rd century), novelist
Maximus (4th century), Neoplatonic philosopher
Sosipatra (4th century), Neoplatonic philosopher
Manuel Philes (c. 1275 – 1345), Byzantine poet

See also 

 Ancient settlements in Turkey
 Christianity in the 1st century
 Christianity in the 2nd century
 Christianity in the 3rd century
 Early centers of Christianity
 Early Christian art and architecture
 Early Christianity
 Nea Efesos

References

Sources
Foss, Clive. 1979. "Ephesus After Antiquity." Cambridge: Cambridge University Press. 
Athas, Daphne. 1991. Entering Ephesus. Sag Harbor, NY: Second Chance Press.
Oster, Richard. 1987. A Bibliography of Ancient Ephesus. Philadelphia: American Theological Library Association.
Scherrer, Peter, Fritz Krinzinger, and Selahattin Erdemgil. 2000. Ephesus: The New Guide. Rev. ed. 2000. Turkey: Ege Yayinlari (Zero Prod. Ltd.).
Leloux, Kevin. 2018. "The Campaign Of Croesus Against Ephesus: Historical & Archaeological Considerations", in Polemos 21–2, p. 47–63.

External links 

Official website
Official website of the terrace houses of Ephesus
Coinage of Ephesus
The Theatre at Ephesus
Photos from Ephesus (2015)
This Is What The Ancient Greek City Ephesus Most Probably Looked Like (The Mind Circle, Alpix, 2022)

 
Ancient Greek archaeological sites in Turkey
Ephesus
Archaeological sites in the Aegean Region
Athenian colonies
Former populated places in Turkey
History of İzmir Province
Holy cities
Ionian League
Members of the Delian League
New Testament cities
Pauline churches
Populated places established in the 10th century BC
Asia (Roman province)
Tourist attractions in İzmir Province
Populated places in ancient Ionia
Former kingdoms